This is a list of recorded fatal shark attacks in South African territorial waters, in reverse chronological order, including cases that were immediately, eventually or presumably fatal.

2020s

2010s

2000s

1990s

1980s

1970s

1960s

1950s

1940s

1930s-1850s

Unknown

References

Shark attacks
shark attacks in South African territorial waters
Deaths due to shark attacks